Calbe (Saale) Ost station is a railway station in the eastern part of the municipality of Calbe (Saale), located in the Salzlandkreis district in Saxony-Anhalt, Germany.

References

Railway stations in Saxony-Anhalt
Buildings and structures in Salzlandkreis
Railway stations in Germany opened in 1839
1839 establishments in Prussia